Seba or SEBA may refer to:

Places
Seba, Indonesia, on the Savu Islands
Seven Brothers Islands, also known as the Seba Islands, part of the Republic of Djibouti

Institutions
Secondary Education Board of Assam, India
Systematic and Evolutionary Biogeography Association

People
Sebá (born 1992), Brazilian footballer Sebastião de Freitas Couto Júnior
Seba (surname)
Seba (musician), Swedish musician Sebastian Ahrenberg
Seba Smith (1792–1868), American humorist and writer
Sebastián Barrientos (born 1989), Chilean former footballer
Sebastiano Serafini (born 1990), Italian actor, model and musician
Sebastián Setti (born 1984), Argentine footballer
Sebastian Sorsa (born 1984), Finnish footballer
SEBA, Antwerp rapper

Other
Seba bat, a species of bat
Seba (biblical figure), a minor figure in the Bible
Seba language, a Bantu language of the Democratic Republic of Congo
Seba Station, a railway station in  Shiojiri City, Japan
SEBA Book Award (now called Southern Book Prize), an American literary award
Seba United, former name and current nickname of the Jamaican football club Montego Bay United F.C.
 A Hawu language dialect